Jakutophyton is an extinct genus of stromatolite-making cyanobacteria.

References

Cyanobacteria genera